Ogai or Ōgai is a surname. Notable people with the surname include:

Dmitry Ogai (born 1960), Kazakhstani football manager
Mori Ōgai (1862–1922), Japanese Army surgeon, translator, novelist, and poet